Helena Scutt (born June 15, 1992) is an American competitive sailor. She competed at the 2016 Summer Olympics in Rio de Janeiro, in the women's 49erFX.

References

1992 births
Living people
American female sailors (sport)
Olympic sailors of the United States
Sailors at the 2016 Summer Olympics – 49er FX
Pan American Games medalists in sailing
Pan American Games bronze medalists for the United States
Sailors at the 2015 Pan American Games
Medalists at the 2015 Pan American Games